Ariamnes waikula is a species of spider from the family Theridiidae. The species is known only from the island of Hawaii, in the state of Hawaii.  The type specimen was collected from wet forest habitat at  elevation.  The species is named for its gold-colored abdomen using the Hawaiian word for gold-colored, "waikula."  A scientific description of this species was first published in 2007 by Gillespie & Rivera.

References

Theridiidae
Spiders of Hawaii
Spiders described in 2007